The western chestnut mouse (Pseudomys nanus) is a species of rodent in the family Muridae.
It is native to northern Australia and various close islands, with the vast majority found in Queensland and the Northern Territory.

Ecology
P. nanus inhabits grasslands and open stands of eucalypt on sandy soil. It is mainly nocturnal and spends the day in a grass nest. Its diet is mostly made up of native grasses and seeds. Breeding occurs most often during the wet season, but the species may breed throughout the year under favourable conditions. Females give birth to between three and five young, after a gestation period of 22–24 days. Fully grown adult mice weigh around 70 g and have an average body length of 10 cm.

Studies in 1999 showed that the species has an excellent capacity for repleting glycogen following exertion, even if they do not eat.

References

Pseudomys
Mammals of Western Australia
Mammals of the Northern Territory
Rodents of Australia
Mammals described in 1858
Taxonomy articles created by Polbot